The Knabstrupper or Knabstrup is a Danish breed of warmblood horse. It is principally a riding horse, but is also used as a harness horse and as a circus animal.

It is broadly similar to the Frederiksborger, but often has a spotted coat. Injudicious breeding for this characteristic alone compromised its constitution and conformation; in the years after the Second World War the mechanisation of agriculture led to a sharp fall in numbers, and by the 1960s no more than 100 examples remained.

History 

The Knabstrupper descends from single mare, believed to have originated in Spain, who showed qualities of endurance and speed and was of a most unusual colouration: she was a deep red with a white tail and mane, and white flecks or "snowflakes" over her whole body and brown spots on her back. She was called Flaebehoppen, 'Flaebe's horse', because she was reportedly bought by a butcher named Flaebe from an officer of the Spanish army. There, in 1808, after a month of testing of her working capabilities, he put her to a Frederiksborger stallion. The stallion Mikkel, a grandson of this pair foaled in 1818, was a noted harness-racer and a foundation stallion of the Knabstrupper breed.

This breed was once very popular, but later was crossbred with other horses, and whether any purebreds from this breed remain is not certain. They do well in dressage and show jumping, and are used in general riding, as carriage and as circus horses. In 1971, three Appaloosa stallions were imported to Denmark to add new blood to the Knabstrupper breed.

Knabstruppers today are bred in Denmark, Norway, Sweden, Switzerland, Italy, Germany, Netherland, the United Kingdom, the United States, and most recently, the Czech Republic, Australia, New Zealand, and Canada.

Characteristics
Coat patterns range from solid to a full leopard-spotted coat, with many variants in between. The spotted coat is caused by a genetic mechanism called the leopard complex. The spotted color patterns common in the Knabstrupper are seen in other breeds, such as the Appaloosa horse, though the two breeds developed independently of one another. The breed generally has either warmblood or Baroque horse conformation.

Some Knabstruppers are born with solid colors, such as bay or chestnut.

References 

Horse breeds
Horse breeds originating in Denmark
Animal breeds on the GEH Red List